Fransien Howarth (born ) is a British netball coach who is mentoring the national netball team of the Philippines. Howarth led the Philippines at their first international stint at the 2015 Southeast Asian Games.

Howarth is also a physical education high school teacher at the International School Manila since 2013 and previously stayed in Bangkok, Thailand prior to her teaching career in Manila.

Statistics

Coaching

References

English netball coaches
English schoolteachers
Women educators
English expatriate sportspeople in the Philippines
Living people
Year of birth missing (living people)